Rhesalides is a genus of moths of the family Erebidae. The genus was erected by Alice Ellen Prout in 1921.

Species
Rhesalides curvata (T. P. Lucas, 1895) Queensland, New Guinea, Admiralty Islands, Fiji
Rhesalides keiensis A. E. Prout, 1921 Kai Islands
Rhesalides natalensis Hampson, 1926 KwaZulu-Natal
Rhesalides nigeriensis Hampson, 1926 southern Nigeria

References

Calpinae
Moth genera